Dimitris "Takis" Nikoloudis (born 26 August 1951) is a Greek former professional footballer who played as a midfielder and a former manager.

Club career

Iraklis
From a young age Nikoloudis was involved in sports, joining Iraklis. According to the customs of the time, the young athletes were involved in more than one sport within the club, until they chose which one to focus on. Thus Nikoloudis, apart from football, was also active in basketball, even playing for the youth team of Iraklis. His talent in football, led him in focusing in the sport and after his participation in all the infrastructure teams of the club, where he was promoted in the first team of Iraklis in 1969.

Playing as a holding midfielder, he impressed with his clever game despite his young age. He played with Iraklis for eight consecutive seasons, being one of the best players in the club and winning the Cup in 1976. However, his career at Iraklis was tarnished when his name was involved in the bribery case known as the "flower case", when shortly before the semi-final of the Cup on May 28, 1975, between Iraklis and Panathinaikos in Kaftanzoglio Stadium, the former Panathinaikos and Iraklis player Giorgos Rokidis, following the orders of Panathinaikos' agent Antonis Mantzavelakis, visited the team of Iraklis at the hotel, offering money to Nikoloudis and the defender Chaliampalias to have a reduced performance in the match. The bouquet that Rokidis was holding during his visit named the case as the "flower case". The management of Iraklis excluded the two players from the match squad as "disciplinary offense". A judicial process followed, where the guilt of all was documented and at the meeting and vote of the Special Committee of the HFF, Panathinaikos was acquitted due to doubts due to the vote of Giorgos Andrianopoulos, while Rokidis and Chaliampalias were banned for life. For Nikoloudis there was leniency and acquittal with the mitigating factor of his young age. This case caused a rupture in the relations of Nikolouis with Heraklis, with the player being out of favor and not competing in the Cup Final, when they won the trophy against Olympiacos, resulting in his transfer to AEK Athens in the summer of 1976.

AEK Athens
Nikoloudis was immediately adjusted in the team that was prepared by František Fadrhonc and became an integral member of their midfield. On 15 September 1976, Nikoloudis scored his first goal, introducing to the people of AEK his "thunderbolt" free kicks and opened the score at the UEFA Cup game against Dynamo Moscow at home in a 2–0 win. In the next round of same tournament he also scored another free kick, this time against Derby County equalizing the score in an epic 3–2 away win. On 25 March 1979, he scored a brace in the away win against Panachaiki. On 8 April 1979, Nikoloudis scored with a power shot in the area the decider goal against Panathinaikos and three minutes later he was expelled alongside Livathinos, after a fierce fight between the players. He played in the yellow-black jersey until December 1979, winning with the team the domestic double in the season 1977–78 and the Championship in 1979, while he was a key member of the team that reached the semi-finals of the UEFA Cup in 1977. The start of the 1979–80 season, found AEK and their owner, Loukas Barlos, in a difficult financial situation, as it was difficult to maintain financially the club's great roster at the time. One night in December 1979, Barlos met by chance the president of Olympiacos, Stavros Daifas and the citation by Barlos of the financial difficulties he was facing and the transfer of Nikoloudis to the red and whites materialized.

Later years
On May 11, 1980, he gave Olympiacos his first professional title, as with his goal, they defeated Panathinaikos 1–0 at Karaiskakis Stadium, leading the championship to a play-off match, which took place at Volos, where Olympiacos won with 2–0 against Aris. With Olympiacos, he won 3 straight championships and 1 Cup including a double in 1981.

In the summer of 1982, the return of Zlatko Čajkovski to AEK Athens' bench was combined with the return of Nikoloudis to the club. He was a shadow of his former self at his first spell at the club and he left in December 1983, after adding another Cup in his collection. He was transferred to Apollon Kalamarias, where he played for a year. In Apollon he played alongside his brother, Grigoris and the two of them contributed in keeping the team in the first division. Afterwards, Nikoloudis competed with Levadiakos in the second division until the summer of 1986, when he retired as a footballer.

International career
Nikoloudis was a member of Greece U21, which in 1971 won the Balkan Youth Championship, while with the military team he finished at the 3rd place in the World Military Cup in 1972.

He made his debut with Greece, on April 7, 1971, in the friendly 0–1 defeat to Bulgaria at home, playing a total of 22 times and scoring 4 goals. Captain of the national team for years, he was an integral part of the qualifying team of Alketas Panagoulias. His best moment with the Greece was on September 12, 1979, when in the 26th minute of the match, after his collaboration with Giorgos Delikaris, against Soviet Union, he scored 1-0 and with this as the final result, the team qualified, for the first time in its history, to the final stage of a major international event, the UEFA Euro 1980 in Italy in which it competed in the only match in which the national team got a point, the 0–0 draw with the eventuall champions West Germany.

Managerial career
Nikoloudis was the manager of Veria for a brief period in 1989.

After football
Nikoloudis lives permanently in Thessaloniki and has been involved in the business of five-a-side football fields.

Personal life
His brother Grigoris was also a football player, who played at Alpha Ethniki, with Makedonikos and Apollon Kalamaria.

Style of play
Nikoloudis played as a central midfielder or as an attacking midfielder. Possessing high-level technical virtues combined with his clever plays, he presented himself on the pitch as a player–leader who led the team masterfully, always playing with his head up. All of the above was accompanied by his power shot that often took the chance to try, especially from free kicks. Nikoloudis' free kicks on the contrary of the "banana" free kicks often seen by skilled players, where the wall of defenders and the goalkeeper are misled by the elliptical trajectory of the ball, were straight forward and unleashed with tremendous power, so that they were characterized as "thunderbolts".

Honours

Iraklis
Greek Cup: 1975–76

AEK Athens
Alpha Ethniki: 1977–78, 1978–79
Greek Cup: 1977–78, 1982–83

Olympiacos
Alpha Ethniki: 1979–80, 1980–81, 1981–82
Greek Cup: 1980–81

Individual
Greek Cup top scorer: 1975

Greece U21
Balkan Youth Championship: 1971

References

External links

1951 births
Living people
Association football midfielders
Greek footballers
Greece international footballers
AEK Athens F.C. players
Iraklis Thessaloniki F.C. players
Olympiacos F.C. players
UEFA Euro 1980 players
Super League Greece players
Veria F.C. managers
Greek football managers
Footballers from Thessaloniki